MIUI (pronunciation: Me You I) is a mobile UI (User Interface) developed and maintained by Xiaomi exclusively for its smartphones. MIUI is based on Android Open Source Project and serves as the basis for other operating systems created by Xiaomi: MIUI for POCO, MIUI for Pad, MIUI for Watch, and MIUI for TV (PatchWall). 

There are different versions for each Xiaomi phone, and each version has variants according to the regions in which the phone is sold, such as China, Japan, Pakistan, Russia, Indonesia, India, Taiwan and Turkey. Alongside MIUI, Xiaomi have also released devices running Google's Android One. Xiaomi devices usually get three Android version updates, but get MIUI updates for four years.

The first MIUI ROM, released in 2010, was based on Android 2.2.x Froyo and was initially developed in the Chinese language by the then-startup company. Xiaomi added a number of apps to the basic framework, including their Notes, Backup, Music, and Gallery apps.

An organisation named Xiaomi Europe (xiaomi.eu), not a part of Xiaomi, was set up in 2010 as a community for English-language MIUI Android and Xiaomi products. xiaomi.eu issues its own versions of Xiaomi MIUI ROMs, based on the stable and weekly beta versions of the Chinese ROM. Installing the xiaomi.eu ROM voids the warranty on Xiaomi phones; according to the xiaomi.eu leader, the official ROM must be flashed and the bootloader locked before returning a device for warranty repair.

MIUI and Google Play services 
Google has had disagreements with the Chinese government, and access to many Google services is blocked.
MIUI does not ship with Google Play Services in mainland China. However, Xiaomi has expanded its operations outside China; MIUI releases for Android devices outside mainland China have Google Play Services and Google Apps such as Gmail, Google Maps, YouTube,Google Play Store pre-installed and functioning as on any other Android device. MIUI global versions are certified by Google.

Comparison of all MIUI variants

MIUI vs Android 
Although the MIUI is built on the Android platform, the default user interface of its earlier iterations resembled iOS due to the absence of the application tray, with a grid of icons arrayed in the home panels. Other iOS similarities include the app icons being in a uniform shape, the dialer and in-call interface, the organization of the Settings app, and the visual appearance of toggles in the UI. This prompted some observers to cite how the devices running on MIUI could appeal to iOS users wanting to switch to the Android platform. By 2018, MIUI was increasingly shifting towards a design aesthetic more similar to the stock Android. For instance, several elements in the MIUI 10 build resemble Android Pie features such as the multitasking menu and gesture controls. This change was first seen in the MIUI 9 (ver. 8.5.11) that shipped with the Xiaomi Mi MIX 2S. The MIUI firmware already looked like stock Android P.

Another difference from Android is the MIUI's support for themes and custom fonts. Users can download theme packs and fonts, which can change the user interface of the device once installed from the Mi Themes Store. It allows advanced users to tweak the hard-coded firmware of their handsets.

Issues 

MIUI's kernel was proprietary, and in breach of Linux kernel's GPL. Source code for certain components was released to GitHub on 25 October 2013. Kernel sources for a few devices, including the Mi3, Mi4, MiNote, and Redmi 1S, were released in March 2015.

In order to raise funds for the company, MIUI has its own online services from Xiaomi, including cloud services, paid themes and games. Payments are transacted using the Mi Credit digital currency.

After the government of India banned over 100 Chinese apps and services in 2020 due to national security and privacy concerns, including some made by Xiaomi, the company developed a MIUI version without them for India.

Vulnerabilities 
In April 2019, security researcher Arif Khan reported that Xiaomi's browser apps Mi Browser and Mint Browser suffered from a vulnerability that allowed the URL address bar to be spoofed, which affected Indian as well as certain global versions of MIUI. Xiaomi gave Khan a bug bounty but opted not to fix this issue. In addition, a vulnerability in a wallpaper carousel app Glance on Indian versions of MIUI allowed a user to bypass the lock screen and access clipboard data. This vulnerability was eventually fixed by Xiaomi.

Performance issues 
MIUI offers great usage until a point. Users complain about overheating, slow performance, drop in framerate, unstable app function and randomly missing files on the phone storage. Compared to MIUI 12.5, the custom skin brings in several performance improvements and adds numerous features.

Version history

See also
 List of custom Android firmware
 Comparison of mobile operating systems
 List of free and open-source Android applications

References

External links
 Chinese official website
 English official website 

Custom Android firmware
Embedded Linux
Mobile Linux
Cloud clients
Mobile operating systems
Free mobile software
Xiaomi
Chinese brands
Linux distributions